Juan Ángel Delgado Murillo (born 21 July 1992) is a Honduran professional footballer who plays as a midfielder for Motagua.

Career
Delgado began his career with Honduras Progreso in 2012. He made his professional debut with Progreso in a 2–0 Liga Nacional win over Olimpia on 2 August 2014. After years as a staple to Progreso's side, he transferred to Motagua in February 2021.

International career
Delgado was called up to represent Honduras at the 2021 CONCACAF Gold Cup.

Personal life
Delgado is the brother of the Honduras international footballer Edder Delgado.

References

External links
 
 Motagua Profile

1992 births
Living people
People from Cortés Department
Honduran footballers
Honduras international footballers
Association football midfielders
C.D. Honduras Progreso players
F.C. Motagua players
Liga Nacional de Fútbol Profesional de Honduras players
2021 CONCACAF Gold Cup players